Douglas Donald Everett (August 12, 1927 – March 27, 2018) was a Canadian automobile dealer, lawyer, and retired Senator.

Born in Vancouver, British Columbia, he attended the Royal Canadian Naval College in Royal Roads, British Columbia from 1943 to 1945 and served as a Sub-Lieutenant from 1943 to 1947. After his military service, he received a Bachelor of Laws degree from Osgoode Hall Law School in 1950 and from the University of Manitoba in 1951. He was called to Bar of Ontario in 1950 and the Bar of Manitoba in 1951.

In 1966, he was appointed to the Senate representing the senatorial division of Fort Rouge, Manitoba. In 1969, he promoted a bill addressing the production and conservation of oil and gas in Canada's north.

He sat as a Liberal until 1990 when he resigned from the Liberal Party over his support of the introduction of the GST. He then sat as an Independent Liberal. He resigned from the Senate in 1994. Everett died in March 2018 at the age of 90.

References

External links
 

1927 births
2018 deaths
Canadian military personnel of World War II
Canadian Anglicans
Lawyers in Manitoba
Lawyers in Ontario
Canadian senators from Manitoba
Independent Canadian senators
Liberal Party of Canada senators
Politicians from Vancouver